The Universim is an indie, simulation god-style video game developed by Crytivo Games, in which the player takes the role of God and guides the development of civilization through the ages. Development started in April 2014. It is planned to be released on Microsoft Windows, MacOS and Linux. It was released in early access for Steam on August 28, 2018.

Synopsis
The Universim is a planet management game where the player takes the role of the "Creator", and guides the development of civilization. Each planet is randomly generated and can be colonised given enough time and technology. Initially the game starts in the Stone Age where the player needs to build basic shelters and invent fire. Buildings and society evolve as civilization progresses unlocking new buildings and technologies. Firstly an Epicentre must be built and other buildings will be developed around it. Standard housing is built automatically but the location of special buildings like Power Plants and Farms has to be specified by the player.  Resources such as food, clothing and power must be managed in order to speed up development, survive long winters and cope with natural disasters. Eventually you can guide your civilisation past the Modern era to the Space era where it is possible to colonise other planets and harvest valuable resources from these planets.

Each planet on Universim is dynamic and evolves throughout the game. There is weather simulation including changing seasons and natural disasters. Meteor crashes and forest fires can wreak havoc upon your civilisation and long winters can slow development. Many planets have alien inhabitants, some are friendly but others are not and have to be defended against. Your citizens, known as "Nuggets", have the ability to make their own decisions and do things their own way; this can create dangerous problems and even lead to wars which the player can attempt to stop. As well as managing development the player also has to keep their civilisation loyal and under control. The players influence is based on two elements which are Power and Wrath. Power comes from successful completion of tasks and allows the player to alter the world e.g. change the weather. Wrath is generated when the Nuggets fail to complete tasks, this allows the player to unleash destruction on the world to scare the Nuggets into action.

Development
In April 2014, Crytivo Games started their Kickstarter for The Universim aiming to raise $320,000 which was successful with them raising a total of $387,345.

On June 13, 2014, PayPal put a minimum reserve of $1 million on the Crytivo Games account which meant none of their funds could be accessed until their account reached a balance of $1 million. By May 15, 2015, they took to Twitter in an attempt to break PayPal's silence and access their pledged funds.

In June 2015, Crytivo Games brought The Universim to E3 to advertise the game and get feedback from the public.

A Pre-alpha version of the game was released on September 15, 2015 and was available to anyone who bought access to the alpha tier of the game. This preview included a mainly spectator version of the game where players could explore a planet and construct several different buildings. The total gameplay time was about 20 minutes. On August 2, 2016, the alpha version was released after a major update. The alpha version includes more control over the population (referred to as "Nuggets"); most of the Stone Age buildings and mechanics are present, some in-depth functionality like injuries and healthcare are in place, and in-game tutorials were added.

As of October 2017, development of the Medieval era started which included new buildings and technologies.

As of December 2018, development of the Modern era started which included new buildings and technologies.

The Universim is designed using a custom engine referred to as Prometheus, which in turn is based upon the Unity Engine.

See also
 Black & White
 Godus
 Populous

References

External links
The Universim home page
Unity Engine
 

Upcoming video games
Indie video games
Simulation video games
Kickstarter-funded video games
Early access video games
Windows games
MacOS games
Linux games
God games
Video games developed in the United States
Single-player video games